Simon Lumsden is Associate Professor of philosophy at University of New South Wales. He is known for his research on subjectivism, German idealism and poststructuralism.

See also
Subject (philosophy)

Bibliography
 Lumsden S, 2014, Self-Consciousness and the Critique of the Subject: Hegel, Heidegger, and the Poststructuralists, Columbia University Press, New York
 Lumsden S, 2013, 'Deleuze and Hegel on the limits of Self-Determined Subjectivity', in Houle K; Vernon J (ed.), Hegel and Deleuze: Together Again for the First Time, NorthWestern University Press, Evanston, Ill., pp. 133 - 151
 Lumsden S, 2013, 'Between Nature and Spirit: Hegel?s Account of Habit', in Stern DS (ed.), Essays on Hegel's Philosophy of Subjective Spirit, edn. Hardback, State University of New York Press, Albany, pp. 121 - 138

References

External links
 Simon Lumsden

20th-century Australian philosophers
21st-century Australian philosophers
Academic staff of the University of New South Wales
Continental philosophers
Living people
Social philosophers
Poststructuralists
Hermeneutists
Heidegger scholars
University of New South Wales alumni
University of Sydney alumni
Year of birth missing (living people)